The 1998 Royal Bank Cup is the 28th Junior "A" 1998 ice hockey National Championship for the Canadian Junior A Hockey League.

The Royal Bank Cup was competed for by the winners of the Doyle Cup, Anavet Cup, Dudley Hewitt Cup, the Fred Page Cup and a host city.

The tournament was hosted by the Nanaimo Clippers and Nanaimo, British Columbia.

The Playoffs

Round Robin

Results
Nanaimo Clippers defeat Milton Merchants 6–2
South Surrey Eagles defeat Weyburn Red Wings 6–2 for the Abbott Cup
Nanaimo Clippers defeat Brockville Braves 4–3 in Overtime
Weyburn Red Wings defeat Brockville Braves 5–1
South Surrey Eagles defeat Milton Merchants 3–0
Milton Merchants defeat Brockville Braves 5–2
Weyburn Red Wings defeat Milton Merchants 6–2
South Surrey Eagles defeat Nanaimo Clippers 4–0
South Surrey Eagles defeat Brockville Braves 9–2
Nanaimo Clippers defeat Weyburn Red Wings 5–2

Semi-finals and Final

Awards
Most Valuable Player: Peter Wishloff (South Surrey Eagles)
Top Scorer: Kris Wilson (South Surrey Eagles)
Most Sportsmanlike Player: Kirk Feasey (Weyburn Red Wings)
Top Goalie: Peter Wishloff (South Surrey Eagles)
Top forward: Kris Wilson (South Surrey Eagles)
Top Defenceman: Robin Sochan (Nanaimo Clippers)

Roll of League Champions
AJHL: St. Albert Saints
BCHL: South Surrey Eagles
CJHL: Brockville Braves
MJHL: Winkler Flyers
MJAHL: Restigouche River Rats
MetJHL: Wexford Raiders
NOJHL: Rayside-Balfour Sabrecats
OPJHL: Milton Merchants
QJAAAHL: Coaticook Frontaliers
RMJHL: Cranbrook Colts
SJHL: Weyburn Red Wings

See also
Canadian Junior A Hockey League
Royal Bank Cup
Anavet Cup
Doyle Cup
Dudley Hewitt Cup
Fred Page Cup
Abbott Cup
Mowat Cup

External links
Royal Bank Cup Website

1998
Royal Bank Cup
Royal Bank Cup